John Putney (born March 6, 1944) was the Iowa State Senator from the 20th District and minority whip. A Republican, he served in the Iowa Senate from 2003 until his 2009 retirement.  He attended the University of Nebraska and received his Bachelors in Farm Operations from Iowa State University.

Putney served on several committees in the Iowa Senate during his last term - the Agriculture committee; the Appropriations committee; the Commerce committee; the Ethics committee; the Transportation committee; and the Ways and Means committee.  He was the ranking member of the Transportation, Infrastructure, and Capitals Appropriations Subcommittee.

Putney was re-elected in 2004 with 21,784 votes in an uncontested election.   He did not be seek re-election to the Senate in 2008.

External links
Iowa General Assembly - Senator John Putney official government website

Follow the Money - John Putney
2006 2004 2002 2000 campaign contributions

1944 births
Living people
Republican Party Iowa state senators
University of Nebraska alumni
Iowa State University alumni
People from Tama County, Iowa